This is a list of the bird species recorded in Turkmenistan. The avifauna of Turkmenistan include a total of 438 species.

This list's taxonomic treatment (designation and sequence of orders, families and species) and nomenclature (common and scientific names) follow the conventions of The Clements Checklist of Birds of the World, 2022 edition. The family accounts at the beginning of each heading reflect this taxonomy, as do the species counts found in each family account. Accidental species are included in the total species count for Turkmenistan.

The following tags have been used to highlight several categories. The commonly occurring native species do not fall into any of these categories.

(A) Accidental - a species that rarely or accidentally occurs in Turkmenistan
 (Ex) Extirpated - a species no longer found in Turkmenistan but found elsewhere

Ducks, geese, and waterfowl
Order: AnseriformesFamily: Anatidae

Anatidae includes the ducks and most duck-like waterfowl, such as geese and swans. These birds are adapted to an aquatic existence with webbed feet, flattened bills, and feathers that are excellent at shedding water due to an oily coating.

Graylag goose, Anser anser
Swan goose, Anser cygnoides (A)
Greater white-fronted goose, Anser albifrons
Lesser white-fronted goose, Anser erythropus
Taiga bean-goose, Anser fabalis
Red-breasted goose, Branta ruficollis
Mute swan, Cygnus olor
Tundra swan, Cygnus columbianus
Whooper swan, Cygnus cygnus
Ruddy shelduck, Tadorna ferruginea
Common shelduck, Tadorna tadorna
Baikal teal, Sibirionetta formosa (A)
Garganey, Spatula querquedula
Northern shoveler, Spatula clypeata
Gadwall, Mareca strepera
Falcated duck, Mareca falcata (A)
Eurasian wigeon, Mareca penelope
Mallard, Anas platyrhynchos
Northern pintail, Anas acuta
Green-winged teal, Anas crecca
Marbled teal, Marmaronetta angustirostris
Red-crested pochard, Netta rufina
Common pochard, Aythya ferina
Ferruginous duck, Aythya nyroca
Tufted duck, Aythya fuligula
Greater scaup, Aythya marila
Velvet scoter, Melanitta fusca
Stejneger's scoter, Melanitta stejnegeri
Common scoter, Melanitta nigra (A)
Long-tailed duck, Clangula hyemalis
Common goldeneye, Bucephala clangula
Smew, Mergellus albellus
Common merganser, Mergus merganser
Red-breasted merganser, Mergus serrator
White-headed duck, Oxyura leucocephala (A)

Pheasants, grouse, and allies
Order: GalliformesFamily: Phasianidae

The Phasianidae are a family of terrestrial birds. In general, they are plump (although they vary in size) and have broad, relatively short wings.

Ring-necked pheasant, Phasianus colchicus
Black francolin, Francolinus francolinus
Caspian snowcock, Tetraogallus caspius
See-see partridge, Ammoperdix griseogularis
Common quail, Coturnix coturnix
Chukar, Alectoris chukar

Flamingos
Order: PhoenicopteriformesFamily: Phoenicopteridae

Flamingos filter-feed on shellfish and algae. Their oddly shaped beaks are specially adapted to separate mud and silt from the food they consume and, uniquely, are used upside-down.

Greater flamingo, Phoenicopterus roseus

Grebes
Order: PodicipediformesFamily: Podicipedidae

Grebes are small to medium-large freshwater diving birds. They have lobed toes and are excellent swimmers and divers. However, they have their feet placed far back on the body, making them quite ungainly on land.

Little grebe, Tachybaptus ruficollis
Horned grebe, Podiceps auritus
Red-necked grebe, Podiceps grisegena
Great crested grebe, Podiceps cristatus
Eared grebe, Podiceps nigricollis

Pigeons and doves
Order: ColumbiformesFamily: Columbidae

Pigeons and doves are stout-bodied birds with short necks and short slender bills with a fleshy cere.

Rock pigeon, Columba livia
Hill pigeon, Columba rupestris (A)
Snow pigeon, Columba leuconota (A)
Stock dove, Columba oenas
Yellow-eyed pigeon, Columba eversmanni
Common wood-pigeon, Columba palumbus
European turtle-dove, Streptopelia turtur
Oriental turtle-dove, Streptopelia orientalis
Eurasian collared-dove, Streptopelia decaocto
Laughing dove, Streptopelia senegalensis

Sandgrouse
Order: PterocliformesFamily: Pteroclidae

Sandgrouse have small, pigeon like heads and necks, but sturdy compact bodies. They have long pointed wings and sometimes tails and a fast direct flight. Flocks fly to watering holes at dawn and dusk. Their legs are feathered down to the toes.

Pallas's sandgrouse, Syrrhaptes paradoxus
Pin-tailed sandgrouse, Pterocles alchata
Spotted sandgrouse, Pterocles senegallus (A)
Black-bellied sandgrouse, Pterocles orientalis

Bustards
Order: OtidiformesFamily: Otididae

Bustards are large terrestrial birds mainly associated with dry open country and steppes in the Old World. They are omnivorous and nest on the ground. They walk steadily on strong legs and big toes, pecking for food as they go. They have long broad wings with "fingered" wingtips and striking patterns in flight. Many have interesting mating displays.

Great bustard, Otis tarda
Macqueen's bustard, Chlamydotis macqueenii
Little bustard, Tetrax tetrax

Cuckoos
Order: CuculiformesFamily: Cuculidae

The family Cuculidae includes cuckoos, roadrunners and anis. These birds are of variable size with slender bodies, long tails and strong legs. The Old World cuckoos are brood parasites.

Great spotted cuckoo, Clamator glandarius (A)
Asian koel, Eudynamys scolopaceus (A)
Lesser cuckoo, Cuculus poliocephalus (A)
Common cuckoo, Cuculus canorus
Oriental cuckoo, Cuculus optatus

Nightjars and allies
Order: CaprimulgiformesFamily: Caprimulgidae

Nightjars are medium-sized nocturnal birds that usually nest on the ground. They have long wings, short legs and very short bills. Most have small feet, of little use for walking, and long pointed wings. Their soft plumage is camouflaged to resemble bark or leaves.

Eurasian nightjar, Caprimulgus europaeus
Egyptian nightjar, Caprimulgus aegyptius

Swifts
Order: CaprimulgiformesFamily: Apodidae

Swifts are small birds which spend the majority of their lives flying. These birds have very short legs and never settle voluntarily on the ground, perching instead only on vertical surfaces. Many swifts have long swept-back wings which resemble a crescent or boomerang.

Alpine swift, Apus melba
Common swift, Apus apus
Little swift, Apus affinis (A)

Rails, gallinules, and coots
Order: GruiformesFamily: Rallidae

Rallidae is a large family of small to medium-sized birds which includes the rails, crakes, coots and gallinules. Typically they inhabit dense vegetation in damp environments near lakes, swamps or rivers. In general they are shy and secretive birds, making them difficult to observe. Most species have strong legs and long toes which are well adapted to soft uneven surfaces. They tend to have short, rounded wings and to be weak fliers.

Water rail, Rallus aquaticus
Corn crake, Crex crex
Spotted crake, Porzana porzana
Eurasian moorhen, Gallinula chloropus
Eurasian coot, Fulica atra
Gray-headed swamphen, Porphyrio poliocephalus
Little crake, Zapornia parva
Baillon's crake, Zapornia pusilla

Cranes
Order: GruiformesFamily: Gruidae

Cranes are large, long-legged and long-necked birds. Unlike the similar-looking but unrelated herons, cranes fly with necks outstretched, not pulled back. Most have elaborate and noisy courting displays or "dances".

Demoiselle crane, Anthropoides virgo
Siberian crane, Leucogeranus leucogeranus (A) 
Common crane, Grus grus

Thick-knees
Order: CharadriiformesFamily: Burhinidae

The thick-knees are a group of largely tropical waders in the family Burhinidae. They are found worldwide within the tropical zone, with some species also breeding in temperate Europe and Australia. They are medium to large waders with strong black or yellow-black bills, large yellow eyes and cryptic plumage. Despite being classed as waders, most species have a preference for arid or semi-arid habitats.

Eurasian thick-knee, Burhinus oedicnemus

Stilts and avocets
Order: CharadriiformesFamily: Recurvirostridae

Recurvirostridae is a family of large wading birds, which includes the avocets and stilts. The avocets have long legs and long up-curved bills. The stilts have extremely long legs and long, thin, straight bills.

Black-winged stilt, Himantopus himantopus
Pied avocet, Recurvirostra avosetta

Ibisbill
Order: CharadriiformesFamily: Ibidorhynchidae

The ibisbill is related to the waders, but is sufficiently distinctive to be a family unto itself. The adult is grey with a white belly, red legs, a long down curved bill, and a black face and breast band.

Ibisbill, Ibidorhyncha struthersii (A)

Oystercatchers
Order: CharadriiformesFamily: Haematopodidae

The oystercatchers are large and noisy plover-like birds, with strong bills used for smashing or prising open molluscs. 

Eurasian oystercatcher, Haematopus ostralegus

Plovers and lapwings
Order: CharadriiformesFamily: Charadriidae

The family Charadriidae includes the plovers, dotterels and lapwings. They are small to medium-sized birds with compact bodies, short, thick necks and long, usually pointed, wings. They are found in open country worldwide, mostly in habitats near water.

Black-bellied plover, Pluvialis squatarola
European golden-plover, Pluvialis apricaria
Pacific golden-plover, Pluvialis fulva (A)
Northern lapwing, Vanellus vanellus
Red-wattled lapwing, Vanellus indicus
Sociable lapwing, Vanellus gregarius
White-tailed lapwing, Vanellus leucurus (A)
Lesser sand-plover, Charadrius mongolus (A)
Greater sand-plover, Charadrius leschenaultii
Caspian plover, Charadrius asiaticus
Kentish plover, Charadrius alexandrinus
Common ringed plover, Charadrius hiaticula
Little ringed plover, Charadrius dubius
Eurasian dotterel, Charadrius morinellus

Sandpipers and allies
Order: CharadriiformesFamily: Scolopacidae

Scolopacidae is a large diverse family of small to medium-sized shorebirds including the sandpipers, curlews, godwits, shanks, tattlers, woodcocks, snipes, dowitchers and phalaropes. The majority of these species eat small invertebrates picked out of the mud or soil. Variation in length of legs and bills enables multiple species to feed in the same habitat, particularly on the coast, without direct competition for food. 

Whimbrel, Numenius phaeopus
Slender-billed curlew, Numenius tenuirostris (A)
Eurasian curlew, Numenius arquata
Bar-tailed godwit, Limosa lapponica
Black-tailed godwit, Limosa limosa
Ruddy turnstone, Arenaria interpres
Red knot, Calidris canutus (A)
Ruff, Calidris pugnax
Broad-billed sandpiper, Calidris falcinellus
Curlew sandpiper, Calidris ferruginea
Temminck's stint, Calidris temminckii
Sanderling, Calidris alba
Dunlin, Calidris alpina
Purple sandpiper, Calidris maritima (A)
Little stint, Calidris minuta
Pectoral sandpiper, Calidris melanotos (A)
Jack snipe, Lymnocryptes minimus
Eurasian woodcock, Scolopax rusticola
Solitary snipe, Gallinago solitaria
Great snipe, Gallinago media
Common snipe, Gallinago gallinago
Terek sandpiper, Xenus cinereus
Red-necked phalarope, Phalaropus lobatus
Red phalarope, Phalaropus fulicarius (A)
Common sandpiper, Actitis hypoleucos
Green sandpiper, Tringa ochropus
Spotted redshank, Tringa erythropus
Common greenshank, Tringa nebularia
Marsh sandpiper, Tringa stagnatilis
Wood sandpiper, Tringa glareola
Common redshank, Tringa totanus

Pratincoles and coursers
Order: CharadriiformesFamily: Glareolidae

Glareolidae is a family of wading birds comprising the pratincoles, which have short legs, long pointed wings and long forked tails, and the coursers, which have long legs, short wings and long, pointed bills which curve downwards.

Cream-colored courser, Cursorius cursor
Collared pratincole, Glareola pratincola
Black-winged pratincole, Glareola nordmanni

Skuas and jaegers
Order: CharadriiformesFamily: Stercorariidae

The family Stercorariidae are, in general, medium to large birds, typically with grey or brown plumage, often with white markings on the wings. They nest on the ground in temperate and arctic regions and are long-distance migrants.

Pomarine jaeger, Stercorarius pomarinus (A)
Parasitic jaeger, Stercorarius parasiticus
Long-tailed jaeger, Stercorarius longicaudus (A)

Gulls, terns, and skimmers
Order: CharadriiformesFamily: Laridae

Laridae is a family of medium to large seabirds, the gulls, terns, and skimmers. Gulls are typically grey or white, often with black markings on the head or wings. They have stout, longish bills and webbed feet. Terns are a group of generally medium to large seabirds typically with grey or white plumage, often with black markings on the head. Most terns hunt fish by diving but some pick insects off the surface of fresh water. Terns are generally long-lived birds, with several species known to live in excess of 30 years.

Slender-billed gull, Chroicocephalus genei
Black-headed gull, Chroicocephalus ridibundus
Little gull, Hydrocoloeus minutus
Ross's gull, Rhodostethia rosea (A)
Mediterranean gull, Ichthyaetus melanocephalus (A)
Pallas's gull, Ichthyaetus ichthyaetus
Common gull, Larus canus
Caspian gull, Larus cachinnans
Lesser black-backed gull, Larus fuscus (A)
Glaucous gull, Larus hyperboreus (A)
Little tern, Sternula albifrons
Gull-billed tern, Gelochelidon nilotica
Caspian tern, Hydroprogne caspia
Black tern, Chlidonias niger
White-winged tern, Chlidonias leucopterus
Whiskered tern, Chlidonias hybrida
Common tern, Sterna hirundo
Sandwich tern, Thalasseus sandvicensis

Loons
Order: GaviiformesFamily: Gaviidae

Loons are a group of aquatic birds found in many parts of North America and northern Europe. They are the size of a large duck or small goose, which they somewhat resemble when swimming, but to which they are completely unrelated.

Red-throated loon, Gavia stellata
Arctic loon, Gavia arctica

Storks
Order: CiconiiformesFamily: Ciconiidae

Storks are large, long-legged, long-necked, wading birds with long, stout bills. Storks are mute, but bill-clattering is an important mode of communication at the nest. Their nests can be large and may be reused for many years. Many species are migratory.

Black stork, Ciconia nigra
White stork, Ciconia ciconia

Cormorants and shags
Order: SuliformesFamily: Phalacrocoracidae

Phalacrocoracidae is a family of medium to large coastal, fish-eating seabirds that includes cormorants and shags. Plumage colouration varies, with the majority having mainly dark plumage, some species being black-and-white and a few being colourful.

Pygmy cormorant, Microcarbo pygmeus
Great cormorant, Phalacrocorax carbo

Pelicans
Order: PelecaniformesFamily: Pelecanidae

Pelicans are large water birds with a distinctive pouch under their beak. As with other members of the order Pelecaniformes, they have webbed feet with four toes. 

Great white pelican, Pelecanus onocrotalus
Dalmatian pelican, Pelecanus crispus

Herons, egrets, and bitterns
Order: PelecaniformesFamily: Ardeidae

The family Ardeidae contains the bitterns, herons, and egrets. Herons and egrets are medium to large wading birds with long necks and legs. Bitterns tend to be shorter necked and more wary. Members of Ardeidae fly with their necks retracted, unlike other long-necked birds such as storks, ibises and spoonbills.

Great bittern, Botaurus stellaris 
Little bittern, Ixobrychus minutus
Gray heron, Ardea cinerea
Purple heron, Ardea purpurea
Great egret, Ardea alba
Little egret, Egretta garzetta
Cattle egret, Bubulcus ibis
Squacco heron, Ardeola ralloides
Black-crowned night-heron, Nycticorax nycticorax

Ibises and spoonbills
Order: PelecaniformesFamily: Threskiornithidae

Threskiornithidae is a family of large terrestrial and wading birds which includes the ibises and spoonbills. They have long, broad wings with 11 primary and about 20 secondary feathers. They are strong fliers and despite their size and weight, very capable soarers.

Glossy ibis, Plegadis falcinellus
Eurasian spoonbill, Platalea leucorodia

Osprey
Order: AccipitriformesFamily: Pandionidae

The family Pandionidae contains only one species, the osprey. The osprey is a medium-large raptor which is a specialist fish-eater with a worldwide distribution.

Osprey, Pandion haliaetus

Hawks, eagles, and kites
Order: AccipitriformesFamily: Accipitridae

Accipitridae is a family of birds of prey, which includes hawks, eagles, kites, harriers and Old World vultures. These birds have powerful hooked beaks for tearing flesh from their prey, strong legs, powerful talons and keen eyesight.

Bearded vulture, Gypaetus barbatus (A)
Egyptian vulture, Neophron percnopterus
European honey-buzzard, Pernis apivorus (A)
Cinereous vulture, Aegypius monachus
Himalayan griffon, Gyps himalayensis (A)
Eurasian griffon, Gyps fulvus
Short-toed snake-eagle, Circaetus gallicus
Greater spotted eagle, Clanga clanga
Booted eagle, Hieraaetus pennatus
Steppe eagle, Aquila nipalensis
Imperial eagle, Aquila heliaca
Golden eagle, Aquila chrysaetos
Bonelli's eagle, Aquila fasciata
Eurasian marsh-harrier, Circus aeruginosus
Hen harrier, Circus cyaneus
Pallid harrier, Circus macrourus
Montagu's harrier, Circus pygargus
Shikra, Accipiter badius
Levant sparrowhawk, Accipiter brevipes (A)
Eurasian sparrowhawk, Accipiter nisus
Northern goshawk, Accipiter gentilis
Black kite, Milvus migrans
White-tailed eagle, Haliaeetus albicilla
Pallas's fish-eagle, Haliaeetus leucoryphus
Rough-legged buzzard, Buteo lagopus
Common buzzard, Buteo buteo
Himalayan buzzard, Buteo refectus (A)
Long-legged buzzard, Buteo rufinus

Barn-owls
Order: StrigiformesFamily: Tytonidae

Barn owls are medium to large owls with large heads and characteristic heart-shaped faces. They have long strong legs with powerful talons.

Barn owl, Tyto alba (A)

Owls
Order: StrigiformesFamily: Strigidae

The typical owls are small to large solitary nocturnal birds of prey. They have large forward-facing eyes and ears, a hawk-like beak and a conspicuous circle of feathers around each eye called a facial disk.

Eurasian scops-owl, Otus scops
Pallid scops-owl, Otus brucei
Eurasian eagle-owl, Bubo bubo
Snowy owl, Bubo scandiacus (A)
Little owl, Athene noctua
Tawny owl, Strix aluco
Long-eared owl, Asio otus
Short-eared owl, Asio flammeus

Hoopoes
Order: BucerotiformesFamily: Upupidae

Hoopoes have black, white and orangey-pink colouring with a large erectile crest on their head.

Eurasian hoopoe, Upupa epops

Kingfishers
Order: CoraciiformesFamily: Alcedinidae

Kingfishers are medium-sized birds with large heads, long, pointed bills, short legs and stubby tails.

Common kingfisher, Alcedo atthis

Bee-eaters
Order: CoraciiformesFamily: Meropidae

The bee-eaters are a group of near passerine birds in the family Meropidae. Most species are found in Africa but others occur in southern Europe, Madagascar, Australia and New Guinea. They are characterised by richly coloured plumage, slender bodies and usually elongated central tail feathers. All are colourful and have long downturned bills and pointed wings, which give them a swallow-like appearance when seen from afar.

Blue-cheeked bee-eater, Merops persicus
European bee-eater, Merops apiaster

Rollers
Order: CoraciiformesFamily: Coraciidae

Rollers resemble crows in size and build, but are more closely related to the kingfishers and bee-eaters. They share the colourful appearance of those groups with blues and browns predominating. The two inner front toes are connected, but the outer toe is not.

European roller, Coracias garrulus

Woodpeckers
Order: PiciformesFamily: Picidae

Woodpeckers are small to medium-sized birds with chisel-like beaks, short legs, stiff tails and long tongues used for capturing insects. Some species have feet with two toes pointing forward and two backward, while several species have only three toes. Many woodpeckers have the habit of tapping noisily on tree trunks with their beaks.

Eurasian wryneck, Jynx torquilla
Great spotted woodpecker, Dendrocopos major (Ex)
White-winged woodpecker, Dendrocopos leucopterus
Scaly-bellied woodpecker, Picus squamatus
Eurasian green woodpecker, Picus viridis (Ex)

Falcons and caracaras
Order: FalconiformesFamily: Falconidae

Falconidae is a family of diurnal birds of prey. They differ from hawks, eagles and kites in that they kill with their beaks instead of their talons. 

Lesser kestrel, Falco naumanni
Eurasian kestrel, Falco tinnunculus
Red-footed falcon, Falco vespertinus (A)
Merlin, Falco columbarius
Eurasian hobby, Falco subbuteo
Laggar falcon, Falco jugger (A)
Saker falcon, Falco cherrug 
Peregrine falcon, Falco peregrinus

Old world parrots
Order: PsittaciformesFamily: Psittaculidae

Characteristic features of parrots include a strong curved bill, an upright stance, strong legs, and clawed zygodactyl feet. Many parrots are vividly colored, and some are multi-colored. Old World parrots are found from Africa east across south and southeast Asia and Oceania to Australia and New Zealand.
 
Rose-ringed parakeet, Psittacula krameri (A)

Old World orioles
Order: PasseriformesFamily: Oriolidae

The Old World orioles are colourful passerine birds. They are not related to the New World orioles.

Eurasian golden oriole, Oriolus oriolus
Indian golden oriole, Oriolus kundoo

Monarch flycatchers
Order: PasseriformesFamily: Monarchidae

The monarch flycatchers are small to medium-sized insectivorous passerines which hunt by flycatching.

Indian paradise-flycatcher, Terpsiphone paradisi

Shrikes
Order: PasseriformesFamily: Laniidae

Shrikes are passerine birds known for their habit of catching other birds and small animals and impaling the uneaten portions of their bodies on thorns. A typical shrike's beak is hooked, like a bird of prey.

Red-backed shrike, Lanius collurio
Red-tailed shrike, Lanius phoenicuroides
Isabelline shrike, Lanius isabellinus
Brown shrike, Lanius cristatus (A)
Bay-backed shrike, Lanius vittatus
Long-tailed shrike, Lanius schach
Great gray shrike, Lanius excubitor
Lesser gray shrike, Lanius minor
Masked shrike, Lanius nubicus
Woodchat shrike, Lanius senator (A)

Crows, jays, and magpies
Order: PasseriformesFamily: Corvidae

The family Corvidae includes crows, ravens, jays, choughs, magpies, treepies, nutcrackers and ground jays. Corvids are above average in size among the Passeriformes, and some of the larger species show high levels of intelligence.

Eurasian magpie, Pica pica
Turkestan ground-jay, Podoces panderi
Red-billed chough, Pyrrhocorax pyrrhocorax
Yellow-billed chough, Pyrrhocorax graculus (A)
Eurasian jackdaw, Corvus monedula
Daurian jackdaw, Corvus dauuricus (A)
Rook, Corvus frugilegus
Carrion crow, Corvus corone
Hooded crow, Corvus cornix
Brown-necked raven, Corvus ruficollis
Common raven, Corvus corax

Tits, chickadees, and titmice
Order: PasseriformesFamily: Paridae

The Paridae are mainly small stocky woodland species with short stout bills. Some have crests. They are adaptable birds, with a mixed diet including seeds and insects.

Coal tit, Periparus ater
Rufous-naped tit, Periparus rufonuchalis
Eurasian blue tit, Cyanistes caeruleus
Azure tit, Cyanistes cyanus
Great tit, Parus major
Cinereous tit, Parus cinereus

Penduline-tits
Order: PasseriformesFamily: Remizidae

The penduline-tits are a group of small passerine birds related to the true tits. They are insectivores.

Eurasian penduline-tit, Remiz pendulinus
Black-headed penduline-tit, Remiz macronyx
White-crowned penduline-tit, Remiz coronatus

Larks
Order: PasseriformesFamily: Alaudidae

Larks are small terrestrial birds with often extravagant songs and display flights. Most larks are fairly dull in appearance. Their food is insects and seeds.

Desert lark, Ammomanes deserti (A)
Horned lark, Eremophila alpestris
Greater short-toed lark, Calandrella brachydactyla
Hume's lark, Calandrella acutirostris
Bimaculated lark, Melanocorypha bimaculata
Calandra lark, Melanocorypha calandra
Black lark, Melanocorypha yeltoniensis (A)
Asian short-toed lark, Alaudala cheleensis
Turkestan short-toed lark, Alaudala heinei
Wood lark, Lullula arborea
White-winged lark, Alauda leucoptera
Eurasian skylark, Alauda arvensis
Oriental skylark, Alauda gulgula
Crested lark, Galerida cristata

Bearded reedling
Order: PasseriformesFamily: Panuridae

This species, the only one in its family, is found in reed beds throughout temperate Europe and Asia.

Bearded reedling, Panurus biarmicus

Reed warblers and allies
Order: PasseriformesFamily: Acrocephalidae

The members of this family are usually rather large for "warblers". Most are rather plain olivaceous brown above with much yellow to beige below. They are usually found in open woodland, reedbeds, or tall grass. The family occurs mostly in southern to western Eurasia and surroundings, but it also ranges far into the Pacific, with some species in Africa.

Booted warbler, Iduna caligata
Sykes's warbler, Iduna rama
Eastern olivaceous warbler, Iduna pallida
Upcher's warbler, Hippolais languida
Olive-tree warbler, Hippolais olivetorum (A)
Icterine warbler, Hippolais icterina
Moustached warbler, Acrocephalus melanopogon
Sedge warbler, Acrocephalus schoenobaenus
Paddyfield warbler, Acrocephalus agricola
Blyth's reed warbler, Acrocephalus dumetorum
Marsh warbler, Acrocephalus palustris
Eurasian reed warbler, Acrocephalus scirpaceus
Great reed warbler, Acrocephalus arundinaceus
Clamorous reed warbler, Acrocephalus stentoreus

Grassbirds and allies
Order: PasseriformesFamily: Locustellidae

Locustellidae are a family of small insectivorous songbirds found mainly in Eurasia, Africa, and the Australian region. They are smallish birds with tails that are usually long and pointed, and tend to be drab brownish or buffy all over.

River warbler, Locustella fluviatilis
Savi's warbler, Locustella luscinioides
Common grasshopper-warbler, Locustella naevia

Swallows
Order: PasseriformesFamily: Hirundinidae

The family Hirundinidae is adapted to aerial feeding. They have a slender streamlined body, long pointed wings and a short bill with a wide gape. The feet are adapted to perching rather than walking, and the front toes are partially joined at the base.

Bank swallow, Riparia riparia
Pale sand martin, Riparia diluta
Eurasian crag-martin, Ptyonoprogne rupestris
Barn swallow, Hirundo rustica
Wire-tailed swallow, Hirundo smithii
Red-rumped swallow, Cecropis daurica
Common house-martin, Delichon urbicum

Bulbuls
Order: PasseriformesFamily: Pycnonotidae

Bulbuls are medium-sized songbirds. Some are colourful with yellow, red or orange vents, cheeks, throats or supercilia, but most are drab, with uniform olive-brown to black plumage. Some species have distinct crests.

Himalayan bulbul, Pycnonotus leucogenys

Leaf warblers
Order: PasseriformesFamily: Phylloscopidae

Leaf warblers are a family of small insectivorous birds found mostly in Eurasia and ranging into Wallacea and Africa. The species are of various sizes, often green-plumaged above and yellow below, or more subdued with greyish-green to greyish-brown colours.

Yellow-browed warbler, Phylloscopus inornatus (A)
Hume's warbler, Phylloscopus humei
Pallas's leaf warbler, Phylloscopus proregulus (A)
Sulphur-bellied warbler, Phylloscopus griseolus
Plain leaf warbler, Phylloscopus neglectus
Willow warbler, Phylloscopus trochilus
Common chiffchaff, Phylloscopus collybita
Green warbler, Phylloscopus nitidus (A)
Greenish warbler, Phylloscopus trochiloides

Bush warblers and allies
Order: PasseriformesFamily: Scotocercidae

The members of this family are found throughout Africa, Asia, and Polynesia. Their taxonomy is in flux, and some authorities place some genera in other families.

Scrub warbler, Scotocerca inquieta
Cetti's warbler, Cettia cetti

Long-tailed tits
Order: PasseriformesFamily: Aegithalidae

Long-tailed tits are a group of small passerine birds with medium to long tails. They make woven bag nests in trees. Most eat a mixed diet which includes insects.

Long-tailed tit, Aegithalos caudatus

Sylviid warblers, parrotbills, and allies
Order: PasseriformesFamily: Sylviidae

The family Sylviidae is a group of small insectivorous passerine birds. They mainly occur as breeding species, as the common name implies, in Europe, Asia and, to a lesser extent, Africa. Most are of generally undistinguished appearance, but many have distinctive songs.

Eurasian blackcap, Sylvia atricapilla
Garden warbler, Sylvia borin
Barred warbler, Curruca nisoria
Lesser whitethroat, Curruca curruca
Eastern Orphean warbler, Curruca crassirostris
Asian desert warbler, Curruca nana
Menetries's warbler, Curruca mystacea
Greater whitethroat, Curruca communis

Laughingthrushes and allies
Order: PasseriformesFamily: Leiothrichidae

The members of this family are diverse in size and colouration, though those of genus Turdoides tend to be brown or greyish. The family is found in Africa, India, and southeast Asia.

Streaked laughingthrush, Trochalopteron lineatum

Kinglets
Order: PasseriformesFamily: Regulidae

The kinglets, also called crests, are a small group of birds often included in the Old World warblers, but frequently given family status because they also resemble the titmice.

Goldcrest, Regulus regulus

Wallcreeper
Order: PasseriformesFamily: Tichodromidae

The wallcreeper is a small bird related to the nuthatch family, which has stunning crimson, grey and black plumage.

Wallcreeper, Tichodroma muraria

Nuthatches
Order: PasseriformesFamily: Sittidae

Nuthatches are small woodland birds. They have the unusual ability to climb down trees head first, unlike other birds which can only go upwards. Nuthatches have big heads, short tails and powerful bills and feet.

Eastern rock nuthatch, Sitta tephronota

Treecreepers
Order: PasseriformesFamily: Certhiidae

Treecreepers are small woodland birds, brown above and white below. They have thin pointed down-curved bills, which they use to extricate insects from bark. They have stiff tail feathers, like woodpeckers, which they use to support themselves on vertical trees.

Bar-tailed treecreeper, Certhia himalayana

Wrens
Order: PasseriformesFamily: Troglodytidae

The wrens are mainly small and inconspicuous except for their loud songs. These birds have short wings and thin down-turned bills. Several species often hold their tails upright. All are insectivorous.

Eurasian wren, Troglodytes troglodytes

Dippers
Order: PasseriformesFamily: Cinclidae

Dippers are a group of perching birds whose habitat includes aquatic environments in the Americas, Europe and Asia. They are named for their bobbing or dipping movements. 

White-throated dipper, Cinclus cinclus (A)

Starlings
Order: PasseriformesFamily: Sturnidae

Starlings are small to medium-sized passerine birds. Their flight is strong and direct and they are very gregarious. Their preferred habitat is fairly open country. They eat insects and fruit. Plumage is typically dark with a metallic sheen.

European starling, Sturnus vulgaris
Rosy starling, Pastor roseus
Brahminy starling, Sturnia pagodarum (A)
Common myna, Acridotheres tristis

Thrushes and allies
Order: PasseriformesFamily: Turdidae

The thrushes are a group of passerine birds that occur mainly in the Old World. They are plump, soft plumaged, small to medium-sized insectivores or sometimes omnivores, often feeding on the ground. Many have attractive songs.

Mistle thrush, Turdus viscivorus
Song thrush, Turdus philomelos
Redwing, Turdus iliacus
Eurasian blackbird, Turdus merula
Fieldfare, Turdus pilaris
Ring ouzel, Turdus torquatus
Black-throated thrush, Turdus atrogularis
Red-throated thrush, Turdus ruficollis (A)

Old World flycatchers
Order: PasseriformesFamily: Muscicapidae

Old World flycatchers are a large group of small passerine birds native to the Old World. They are mainly small arboreal insectivores. The appearance of these birds is highly varied, but they mostly have weak songs and harsh calls.

Spotted flycatcher, Muscicapa striata
Rufous-tailed scrub-robin, Cercotrichas galactotes
European robin, Erithacus rubecula
White-throated robin, Irania gutturalis
Thrush nightingale, Luscinia luscinia
Common nightingale, Luscinia megarhynchos
Bluethroat, Luscinia svecica
Blue whistling-thrush, Myophonus caeruleus
Rusty-tailed flycatcher, Ficedula ruficauda
Taiga flycatcher, Ficedula albicilla (A)
Red-breasted flycatcher, Ficedula parva
Semicollared flycatcher, Ficedula semitorquata (A)
European pied flycatcher, Ficedula hypoleuca 
Collared flycatcher, Ficedula albicollis
Rufous-backed redstart, Phoenicurus erythronota
Common redstart, Phoenicurus phoenicurus
Black redstart, Phoenicurus ochruros
Rufous-tailed rock-thrush, Monticola saxatilis
Blue rock-thrush, Monticola solitarius
Whinchat, Saxicola rubetra
Siberian stonechat, Saxicola maurus
Pied bushchat, Saxicola caprata
Northern wheatear, Oenanthe oenanthe
Isabelline wheatear, Oenanthe isabellina
Desert wheatear, Oenanthe deserti
Eastern black-eared wheatear, Oenanthe melanoleuca
Pied wheatear, Oenanthe pleschanka
Variable wheatear, Oenanthe picata
Finsch's wheatear, Oenanthe finschii
Persian wheatear, Oenanthe chrysopygia

Waxwings
Order: PasseriformesFamily: Bombycillidae

The waxwings are a group of birds with soft silky plumage and unique red tips to some of the wing feathers. In the Bohemian and cedar waxwings, these tips look like sealing wax and give the group its name. These are arboreal birds of northern forests. They live on insects in summer and berries in winter. 

Bohemian waxwing, Bombycilla garrulus

Hypocolius
Order: PasseriformesFamily: Hypocoliidae

The grey hypocolius is a small Middle Eastern bird with the shape and soft plumage of a waxwing. They are mainly a uniform grey colour except the males have a black triangular mask around their eyes.

Hypocolius, Hypocolius ampelinus

Accentors
Order: PasseriformesFamily: Prunellidae

The accentors are in the only bird family, Prunellidae, which is completely endemic to the Palearctic. They are small, fairly drab species superficially similar to sparrows. 

Alpine accentor, Prunella collaris
Radde's accentor, Prunella ocularis
Black-throated accentor, Prunella atrogularis
Dunnock, Prunella modularis

Old World sparrows
Order: PasseriformesFamily: Passeridae

Old World sparrows are small passerine birds. In general, sparrows tend to be small, plump, brown or grey birds with short tails and short powerful beaks. Sparrows are seed eaters, but they also consume small insects.

Saxaul sparrow, Passer ammodendri
House sparrow, Passer domesticus
Spanish sparrow, Passer hispaniolensis
Zarudny's sparrow, Passer zarudnyi
Eurasian tree sparrow, Passer montanus
Rock sparrow, Petronia petronia
Pale rockfinch, Carpospiza brachydactyla
White-winged snowfinch, Montifringilla nivalis
Afghan snowfinch, Montifringilla theresae

Wagtails and pipits
Order: PasseriformesFamily: Motacillidae

Motacillidae is a family of small passerine birds with medium to long tails. They include the wagtails, longclaws and pipits. They are slender, ground feeding insectivores of open country.

Gray wagtail, Motacilla cinerea
Western yellow wagtail, Motacilla flava
Citrine wagtail, Motacilla citreola
White wagtail, Motacilla alba
Richard's pipit, Anthus richardi (A)
Tawny pipit, Anthus campestris
Meadow pipit, Anthus pratensis
Tree pipit, Anthus trivialis
Red-throated pipit, Anthus cervinus
Water pipit, Anthus spinoletta

Finches, euphonias, and allies
Order: PasseriformesFamily: Fringillidae

Finches are seed-eating passerine birds, that are small to moderately large and have a strong beak, usually conical and in some species very large. All have twelve tail feathers and nine primaries. These birds have a bouncing flight with alternating bouts of flapping and gliding on closed wings, and most sing well.

Common chaffinch, Fringilla coelebs
Brambling, Fringilla montifringilla
White-winged grosbeak, Mycerobas carnipes
Hawfinch, Coccothraustes coccothraustes
Common rosefinch, Carpodacus erythrinus
Red-mantled rosefinch, Carpodacus rhodochlamys
Blyth's rosefinch, Carpodacus grandis
Long-tailed rosefinch, Carpodacus sibiricus (A)
Eurasian bullfinch, Pyrrhula pyrrhula (A)
Crimson-winged finch, Rhodopechys sanguineus
Trumpeter finch, Bucanetes githagineus
Mongolian finch, Bucanetes mongolicus
Desert finch, Rhodospiza obsoleta
European greenfinch, Chloris chloris
Twite, Linaria flavirostris
Eurasian linnet, Linaria cannabina
Common redpoll, Acanthis flammea (A)
Red crossbill, Loxia curvirostra
European goldfinch, Carduelis carduelis
Fire-fronted serin, Serinus pusillus
Eurasian siskin, Spinus spinus

Longspurs and snow buntings
Order: PasseriformesFamily: Calcariidae

Lapland longspur, Calcarius lapponicus (A)
Snow bunting, Plectrophenax nivalis (A)

Old World buntings
Order: PasseriformesFamily: Emberizidae

The emberizids are a large family of passerine birds. They are seed-eating birds with distinctively shaped bills. Many emberizid species have distinctive head patterns.

Black-headed bunting, Emberiza melanocephala
Red-headed bunting, Emberiza bruniceps
Corn bunting, Emberiza calandra
Rock bunting, Emberiza cia
White-capped bunting, Emberiza stewarti
Yellowhammer, Emberiza citrinella
Pine bunting, Emberiza leucocephalos
Gray-necked bunting, Emberiza buchanani
Cinereous bunting, Emberiza cineracea (A)
Ortolan bunting, Emberiza hortulana
Reed bunting, Emberiza schoeniclus
Yellow-breasted bunting, Emberiza aureola (A)
Rustic bunting, Emberiza rustica (A)

See also
List of birds
Lists of birds by region

References

Turkmenistan
Turkmenistan
'
birds